This is a list of members of the Australian Senate from 1910 to 1913. Half of its members were elected at the 12 December 1906 election and had terms starting on 1 January 1907 and finishing on 30 June 1913—they had an extended term as a result of the 1906 referendum, which changed Senate terms to finish on 30 December, rather than 30 June—the other half were elected at the 13 April 1910 election and had terms starting on 1 July 1910 and finishing on 30 June 1916. Parties reflect those acknowledged at the time of the 1910 election.

Notes

References

Members of Australian parliaments by term
20th-century Australian politicians
Australian Senate lists